The Forbidden Christ is a 1951 Italian drama film directed by Curzio Malaparte.

Plot 
Bruno is a veteran of the Russian campaign who returned on foot to his Montepulciano. Unlike the other veterans, his happiness at returning home is clouded by the death of his brother, a partisan shot by the Germans because of the betrayal of a fellow villager. Determined to avenge his brother, he tries to get the name of the informer told, but the villagers, tired of the violence and the blood of the war, refuse to reveal it. Mastro Antonio, a modest carpenter friend of Bruno, for fear that he might be guilty of the crime of an innocent person, makes him believe that the man he is looking for is him. At that confession Bruno takes a file and throws it at his heart. Before passing away, the carpenter admits that he lied and sacrificed himself in place of the culprit. Having found the real culprit, he offers himself to Bruno's machine gun shots, but the latter, mindful of his friend's words, does not have the strength to hit the culprit, since an innocent person has already paid for him.

Cast
 Raf Vallone as Bruno Baldi
 Rina Morelli as Mother Baldi
 Alain Cuny as Antonio
 Anna Maria Ferrero as Maria
 Elena Varzi as Nella
 Gino Cervi as The Sexton
 Ernesta Rosmino as Assunta
 Philippe Lemaire as Pinin
 Luigi Tosi as Andrea
 Gualtiero Tumiati as Bruno's Father

Awards
Wins
 1st Berlin International Film Festival – Special Prize for an Excellent Film Achievement

Nominations
 1951 Cannes Film Festival – Palme d'Or

References

External links

1951 films
1950s Italian-language films
1951 drama films
Italian black-and-white films
Films directed by Curzio Malaparte
Italian drama films
1950s Italian films